is a Japanese multinational holding company of ÆON Group. It has its headquarters in Mihama-ku, Chiba, Chiba Prefecture.

It operates all the AEON Retail Stores (formerly known as JUSCO supermarkets) directly in Japan. Meanwhile, AEON CO. (M) BHD operates all the AEON Retail Stores directly in Malaysia.

ÆON is the largest retailer in Asia. ÆON is a retail network comprising around 300 consolidated subsidiaries and 26 equity-method affiliated companies. These range from convenience stores "Ministop" and supermarkets to shopping malls and specialty stores, including having owned the American chain Talbots. ÆON is Japan's single-largest shopping mall developer and operator.

Naming
The name ÆON is a transliteration from the koine Greek word  (ho aion), from the archaic   (aiwon). The name and symbolism used in the branding implies the eternal nature of the company.

History

The company was legally incorporated in September 1926 as Okadaya (founded in 1758). In 1970, Okadaya merged with Futagi and Shiro to form JUSCO Co., Ltd. The employees voted to name the company "Japan United Stores Company".

On August 21, 2001, the company became AEON Co., Ltd.

On August 21, 2008, the corporate structure changed. AEON Co., Ltd. became a holding company while AEON Retail Co., Ltd. took over the retail operations formerly held by AEON Co., Ltd.

As of March 1, 2011, all JUSCO and Saty stores under the AEON umbrella in Japan officially changed their names to AEON while all the JUSCO stores and shopping centres in Malaysia were fully re-branded into AEON since March 2012. However, JUSCO stores still operate in the Greater China region and some others.

In November 2012, AEON acquired the operation of Carrefour Malaysia with an enterprise value of €250 million. All of the current Carrefour hypermarkets and supermarkets in Malaysia were then fully re-branded into AEON BiG. The acquisition of Carrefour Malaysia made AEON as the second largest retailer in Malaysia, which combined the sales from AEON Retail stores (formerly known as JUSCO) and the former Carrefour outlets. Post-acquisition, AEON's ASEAN business vice president said the retail giant targeted to open 100 outlets in various formats in the country by year 2020.

AEON Stores (Hong Kong) Co., Limited was established in Hong Kong in November 1987 and listed on the Hong Kong Stock Exchange in February 1994. AEON aims to develop a chain operation in Hong Kong and offer value-for-money merchandise to Hong Kong customers.

See also
 
 
 Don Quijote (store)
 Maxvalu Tokai

References

 Æon Financial Results for FY 2010 (ended on February 28, 2012)

External links
 

 
1758 establishments in Japan
1970s initial public offerings
Companies based in Chiba Prefecture
Companies listed on the Tokyo Stock Exchange
Holding companies of Japan
Holding companies established in 1758
Japanese brands
Multinational companies headquartered in Japan
Supermarkets of Japan
Retail companies established in 1758
Retail companies of Japan